Poison for One is a 1934 detective novel by John Rhode, the pen name of the British writer Cecil Street. It is the eighteenth in his long-running series of novels featuring Lancelot Priestley, a Golden Age armchair detective. It combines elements of the locked room mystery and country house mystery. Reviewing the book in the Sunday Times leading crime writer Dorothy L. Sayers considered it "as usual, sound, pleasantly written, and entertaining" although she complained the book "was rather spoilt for me by the jacket, which deliberately gives away one-half of the solution."

Synopsis
The weekend guests of the financier Sir Gerald Uppingham at his country estate Bucklesbury Park break into his locked study and discover his corpse, dead of prussic acid. Inspector Hanslet of Scotland Yard is called in, but as usual he is forced to turn to Priestley to fully solve the complex question of how and why Uppingham died and who killed him.

References

Bibliography
 Evans, Curtis. Masters of the "Humdrum" Mystery: Cecil John Charles Street, Freeman Wills Crofts, Alfred Walter Stewart and the British Detective Novel, 1920-1961. McFarland, 2014.
 Herbert, Rosemary. Whodunit?: A Who's Who in Crime & Mystery Writing. Oxford University Press, 2003.
 Reilly, John M. Twentieth Century Crime & Mystery Writers. Springer, 2015.

1934 British novels
Novels by Cecil Street
British crime novels
British mystery novels
British thriller novels
British detective novels
Collins Crime Club books
Novels set in England